Albert van der Haar (born 29 December 1975 in Meppel, Drenthe) is a Dutch former footballer, who played for FC Zwolle most of his career. He also played two seasons for Willem II.

References

1975 births
Living people
People from Meppel
Dutch footballers
PEC Zwolle players
Willem II (football club) players
Eredivisie players
Eerste Divisie players
Association football defenders
PEC Zwolle non-playing staff
Footballers from Drenthe